The largest organisms now found on Earth can be determined according to various aspects of an organism's size, such as: mass, volume, area, length, height, or even genome size. Some organisms group together to form a superorganism (such as ants or bees), but such are not classed as single large organisms. The Great Barrier Reef is the world's largest structure composed of living entities, stretching , but contains many organisms of many types of species.

This article lists the largest species for various types of organisms and mostly considers extant species. The organism sizes listed are frequently considered "outsized" and are not in the normal size range for the respective group.

If considered singular entities, the largest organisms are clonal colonies which can spread over large areas. Pando, a clonal colony of the quaking aspen tree, is widely considered to be the largest such organism by mass. Even if such colonies are excluded, trees retain their dominance of this listing, with the giant sequoia being the most massive tree. In 2006 a huge clonal colony of the seagrass Posidonia oceanica was discovered south of the island of Ibiza.

Among animals, the largest species are all marine mammals, specifically whales. The blue whale is believed to be the largest animal to have ever lived. The living land animal classification is also dominated by mammals, with the African bush elephant being the largest of these.

Plants

The largest such colony is Pando, in the Fishlake National Forest in Utah.

A form of flowering plant that far exceeds Pando as the largest organism on earth in area and probably also mass, is the giant marine plant, Posidonia australis, living in Shark Bay, Australia. It is among the oldest known clonal plants too.

Another giant marine plant of the genus Posidonia, Posidonia oceanica discovered in the Mediterranean near the Balearic Islands, Spain may be the oldest living organism in the world, with an estimated age of 100,000 years.

The largest individual flower in the world is Rafflesia arnoldii, while the flowering plant with the largest unbranched inflorescence in the world is Amorphophallus titanum. Both are native to Sumatra island of Indonesia.

Green algae
Green algae are photosynthetic unicellular and multicellular protists that are related to land plants. The thallus of the unicellular mermaid's wineglass, Acetabularia, can grow to several inches (perhaps 0.1 to 0.2 m) in length. The fronds of the similarly unicellular, and invasive Caulerpa taxifolia can grow up to a foot (0.3 m) long.

Animals

Fungi

The largest living fungus may be a honey fungus of the species Armillaria ostoyae.
A mushroom of this type in the Malheur National Forest in the Blue Mountains of eastern Oregon, U.S. was found to be the largest fungal colony in the world, spanning  of area. This organism is estimated to be 2,400 years old. The fungus was written about in the April 2003 issue of the Canadian Journal of Forest Research. While an accurate estimate has not been made, the total weight of the colony may be as much as 605 tons. If this colony is considered a single organism, then it is the largest known organism in the world by area, and rivals the aspen grove "Pando" as the known organism with the highest living biomass. It is not known, however, whether it is a single organism with all parts of the mycelium connected.

There are many other fungi which produce a larger individual size mushroom. The largest known fruiting body of a fungus is a specimen of Phellinus ellipsoideus (formerly Fomitiporia ellipsoidea) found on Hainan Island.

Until P. ellipsoideus replaced it, the largest individual fruit body came from Rigidoporus ulmarius.

Lichen
Umbilicaria mammulata is among the largest lichens in the world. The thallus of U. mammulata is usually  in diameter, but specimens have been known to reach  in the Smoky Mountains of Tennessee.

The longest lichen is Usnea longissima, which may grow to exceed 20 feet in length.

Protists

(Note: the group Protista is not used in current taxonomy.)

Amoebozoans (Amoebozoa)
These organisms are unicellular, but they are multinucleate.

Euglenozoans (Euglenozoa)
Some euglenophytes, such as certain species of Euglena, reach lengths of 400 μm.

Rhizarians (Rhizaria)
The largest species traditionally considered protozoa are giant amoeboids like foraminiferans.

Alveolates (Alveolata)

Stramenopiles (Stramenopila)
The largest stramenopiles are giant kelp from the northwestern Pacific.
Macrocystis also qualifies as the largest brown alga, the largest chromist, and the largest protist generally.

Bacteria

BBC News described it as possessing the "size and shape of a human eyelash." Science published a new paper on the bacterium on June 23, 2022. According to a study coauthored by Jean-Marie Volland, a marine biologist and scientist at California's Laboratory for Research in Complex Systems, and an affiliate at the US Department of Energy Joint Genome Institute, T. magnifica can grow up to 2 centimeters long.

Cyanobacteria
One of the largest "blue green algae" is Lyngbya, whose filamentous cells can be 50 μm wide.

Viruses

The largest virus on record is the Pithovirus sibericum with the length of 1.5 micrometres, comparable to the typical size of a bacterium and large enough to be seen in light microscopes. It was discovered in March 2014 in an ice core sample collected from a permafrost in Siberia. Prior to this discovery, the largest virus was the peculiar virus genus Pandoravirus, which have a size of approximately 1 micrometer and whose genome contains 1,900,000 to 2,500,000 base pairs of DNA.

Both these viruses infect amoebas specifically.

See also

 Charismatic megafauna
 Deep-sea gigantism
 Genome size
 Island gigantism
 Largest body part
 Largest prehistoric animals
 List of longest-living organisms
 List of heaviest land mammals
 List of world records held by plants
 List of largest inflorescences
 Lists of organisms by population
 List of longest vines
 Megafauna
 Smallest organisms
 Superorganism

References

External links 
 10 of the largest living things on the planet Melissa Breyer. TreeHugger April 28, 2015

Articles containing video clips